Charlotte (minor planet designation: 543 Charlotte) is a minor planet orbiting the Sun. It was discovered by Paul Götz on September 11, 1904, in Heidelberg.

References

External links
 
 

Background asteroids
Charlotte
Charlotte
Xe-type asteroids (SMASS)
19040911